Mohanlal is an Indian actor, playback singer and producer who predominantly works in Malayalam cinema and has acted in over 350 films. He is widely regarded as one of the greatest actors in history of Indian cinema. He has won two national awards for best actor, one special award and one special mention for acting and an award for Best Feature Film (as producer) at
National Film Awards, nine Kerala State Film Awards including six best actor awards, one Nandi Award, nine Filmfare Awards South, two Screen Awards, one International Indian Film Academy Award, four South Indian International Movie Awards, and eleven Kerala Film Critics Association Awards and has received numerous other awards for acting.

Mohanlal began his career in 1978 as an antagonist in the romance film Manjil Virinja Pookkal. After appearing in several of such roles, he established himself as a leading actor in the mid 1980s. In 1986, he starred in the comedy drama T. P. Balagopalan M. A., for which he won the Kerala State Film Award for Best Actor. He also received a Filmfare Award for Best Actor – Malayalam that same year for his performance in the comedy drama Sanmanassullavarkku Samadhanam. Two years later, his role in the drama film Kireedam (1989) earned him a Special Mention. In 1991, he produced and starred in the musical film Bharatham, which earned him the National Film Award for Best Actor. Forbes India classified his role in the film in the "25 Greatest Acting Performances in Indian Cinema" compiled on the centenary of Indian film industry in 2013. Four of his films released in 1997Chandralekha, Guru, Oru Yathramozhi, and Aaraam Thampuran garnered him the Screen Awards South for Best Actor.

He co-produced and starred in the drama film Vanaprastham (1999), his role of a Kathakali artist garnered him the National Film Award for Best Actor, and Kerala State Film Award, Filmfare Awards South, and Kerala Film Critics Association Award for the same category. Mohanlal was nominated for a Filmfare Award for his Hindi debut Company (2002), his performance in the crime drama earned him a Screen Award and an International Indian Film Academy Award for Best Supporting Actor. He portrayed a patient suffering from Alzheimer's disease in the 2005 drama film Thanmathra for which he won the Kerala State Film Award for Best Actor and a Filmfare Award for Best Actor – Malayalam. Mohanlal portrayed an ageing bedridden man in the 2011 romantic drama Pranayam. His role won him the South Indian International Movie Awards for Best actor and other awards including Kerala Film Critics Association Awards, Asianet Film Awards, Vanitha Film Awards, and Mathrubhumi Film Awards. In 2013, he starred in the thriller film Drishyam, for which he won the Kerala Film Critics Association Awards for Best Actor. In 2017, he won the National Film Award – Special Jury Award for his performance in the films Janatha Garage, Munthirivallikal Thalirkkumbol, and Pulimurugan.

In addition to awards for acting, the Government of India honoured him with the Padma Shri, the fourth highest civilian award of the country in 2001, and Padma Bhushan, the third highest civilian award in 2019 for his contribution to the arts. He was given the honorary rank of Lieutenant colonel from Indian Territorial Army in 2009. Mohanlal was awarded the honorary Doctor of Letters from the Sree Sankaracharya University of Sanskrit (2010) and from the University of Calicut (2018), as well as a number of other recognitions.

Titles and Honours

World records
 World's first fans association to enter in the Guinness Book of World Records on charity making the world's largest charity box
 Largest attendance at a 3D film screening
 Lent his voice to the longest documentary made in the world till now.

National Film Awards
The National Film Awards established in 1954, are administered by the Directorate of Film Festivals, Government of India. Mohanlal has received five awards (four for acting and one for producing).

Kerala State Film Awards
The Kerala State Film Awards are presented annually by the Kerala State Chalachitra Academy, Government of Kerala for excellence in Malayalam cinema.

Nandi Awards
The Nandi Awards are presented by the Government of Andhra Pradesh for honouring artistic skills in Telugu cinema.

Filmfare Awards
The Filmfare Awards are presented annually by The Times Group for excellence of cinematic achievements in Hindi cinema.

Filmfare Awards South
The Filmfare Awards South is a part of Filmfare Awards, which is given to the South Indian film industry, that consists of the Tamil, Telugu, Malayalam and Kannada film industries.

Screen Awards
The Screen Awards are annually presented by the Indian Express Limited to honour excellence of cinematic achievements in Hindi and Marathi cinema.

Screen Awards South

International Indian Film Academy Awards
The International Indian Film Academy Awards (IIFA) is annual event organised by the Wizcraft International Entertainment Pvt. Ltd. to honour excellence in the Hindi cinema.

IIFA Utsavam
The IIFA Utsavam is an event organised by the Wizcraft International Entertainment Pvt. Ltd. to reward the artistic and technical achievements in South Indian cinema, that includes Telugu, Tamil, Malayalam, and Kannada cinema.

South Indian International Movie Awards
The South Indian International Movie Awards (SIIMA) are presented annually by the Vibri Media to recognise the best work in Telugu, Tamil, Malayalam, and Kannada film industries.

Kerala Film Critics Awards
The Kerala Film Critics Association Awards are presented annually (since 1977) by the Kerala Film Critics Association for excellence in Malayalam cinema.

Ananda Vikatan Cinema Awards
Ananda Vikatan Cinema Awards is an annual awards ceremony for people in the Tamil film industry.

All India Radio Awards
The All India Radio (or Akashvani) is the national public radio broadcaster of India and is a division of Prasar Bharati.

Asianet Film Awards
The Asianet Film Awards are presented annually (since 1998) by the television network Asianet, owned by Star India, a subsidiary of The Walt Disney Company.

Vanitha Film Awards
The Vanitha Film Awards is an annual awards ceremony organised by the woman's magazine Vanitha, part of the Malayala Manorama group, since 1998.

Asiavision Awards

Mathrubhumi Film Awards
The Mathrubhumi Film Awards are presented annually by the daily newspaper Mathrubhumi.

Amrita Film Awards
The Amrita Film Awards are presented annually by the television channel Amrita TV.

Jaihind Film Awards
The Jaihind Film Awards are presented annually by the television channel Jaihind TV.

Janmabhumi Cinema Awards
The Janmabhumi Cinema Awards are presented annually by the daily newspaper Janmabhumi.

The Kochi Times Film Awards
The Kochi Times Film Awards are presented by the Kochi Times news division of The Times of India.

Kerala Film Audience Council Awards
The Kerala Film Audience Council Awards are presented by the Kerala Film Audience Council.

V. Shantaram Awards
The V. Shantaram Awards, established in 1993, was instituted by the Government of India, Government of Maharashtra, and the V. Shantaram Motion Picture Scientific Research and Cultural Foundation.

Ramu Kariat Awards

Other awards and recognitions
1977-78 Kerala State Wrestling Champion
2003 Honoured by Indian Medical Association
2003 Kerala University Union Film Awards for Best Actor - Balettan
2005 J.C. Foundation Awards for Best Actor - Thanmathra
2005 Kala Keralam Award for Best Actor - Thanmathra
2005 National Film Academy Award for Best Actor - Thanmathra
2006 CNN-IBN poll - Most Popular Keralite Award
2007 Kerala AIDS Control Society – Goodwill Ambassador
2009 Kerala State Athletics – Goodwill Ambassador
2009 Limca Book of Records "People of the year" Award
2009 Sree Chithira Thirunal National Award 
2009 Annual Malayalam Movie Awards for Best Actor - Bhramaram
2009 Kairali TV  Movie Awards for Best Actor - Bhramaram
2009 Jaycee Award for Best Actor - Bhramaram
2010 Reader's Digest included him in the list of "100 Most Trusted Indians".
2010 Thikkurissy Sukumaran Nair Memorial National Award for his contributions to Indian Cinema.
2010 Kerala Handloom Industry – Goodwill Ambassador
2011 Deccan Chronicle Survey - Most Popular Keralite
2011 Kerala Film Producers Association for Best Actor - Pranayam
2011 Viewers Choice Awards for Best Actor - Pranayam
2011 Nana Film Awards Special Jury Mention - Pranayam
2011 Reporter TV Film Awards for Best Actor - Pranayam
2012 His film Iruvar was included in the British Film Institute Sight and Sound "1000 greatest films of all time".
2013 Outlook India - "Most Influential Indian from Kerala".
2013 Forbes India included his 1991 role in Bharatham as one of the "25 Greatest Acting Performances of Indian Cinema".
2013 CNN-IBN survey on "100 years of Indian cinema" – 3rd position as India's Great Actors.
2015 All-Kerala Advertisers Agencies Association honoured him with the title "Brand Icon of Kerala" for his contributions to advertising world.
2016 Kerala organ donation programme - Goodwill Ambassador.
2016 Won "Manorama Newsmaker of The Year", title given to a Keralite who has hogged the most headlines and brought a positive change in society.
2017 "Indian Icon 2017" Award by Friends of Bahrain.
2018 P. Kesavadev Diabscreen Kerala Award
2019 Mazhavil Entertainment Awards – Ultimate Entertainer Actor
2020 P. V. Sami Memorial Industrial and Socio-cultural Award, for his contributions to Malayalam cinema for the last four decades and contributions for charity through ViswaSanthi Foundation
2021 Goodwill Ambassador of Tuberculosis eradication campaign by health department of the Government of Kerala
2020 DP International Film Festival Awards South – Most Versatile Actor
2022 Mazhavil Entertainment Awards – Master Entertainer Acting

References

External links
 

Awards
Lists of awards received by Indian actor